Wyatt Teller (born November 21, 1994) is an American football guard for the Cleveland Browns of the National Football League (NFL). He played college football at Virginia Tech.

College career
After high school, Teller committed to play football at Virginia Tech over at least 16 other FBS programs. After his senior season with the Hokies, Teller was named to the All-ACC first team, as well as the runner up for the ACC Jacobs Blocking Trophy. He was also invited to the 2018 Senior Bowl.

Professional career

After his senior season, Teller was invited to the 2018 NFL Combine, where he recorded the second best broad jump of all the offensive lineman as well as the fifth most bench press reps and fifth fastest 3-cone drill time.

Buffalo Bills
Teller was drafted by the Buffalo Bills in the fifth round (166th overall) of the 2018 NFL Draft. The Bills previously acquired the pick used to select Teller in a trade that sent Marcell Dareus to the Jacksonville Jaguars. He entered his rookie season as a backup guard, but then was named the starting left guard in Week 10, where he started the final seven games.

Cleveland Browns

On August 29, 2019, Teller—along with a 2021 seventh-round pick—was traded to the Cleveland Browns for 2020 fifth- and sixth-round picks. After serving as a backup for the first half of his debut season in Cleveland, Teller earned a spot in the starting line up in Week 9, and went on to start the rest of the season. Heading into week five of the 2020 NFL season, NFL.com writer Nick Shook mentioned Teller as an MVP candidate for the performance of Cleveland's running game, mainly led by him and offensive tackle Jack Conklin. Teller was placed on the reserve/COVID-19 list by the team on December 8, 2020, and activated on December 13. Teller was named to the 2020 All-Pro Team, along with three of his teammates: defensive end Myles Garrett, tackle Jack Conklin, and fellow guard Joel Bitonio.

On November 9, 2021, Teller signed a four-year, $56.8 million contract extension with the Browns through the 2025 season.

References

External links
Cleveland Browns bio
 Virginia Tech Hokies bio

1994 births
Living people
American football offensive guards
Buffalo Bills players
Cleveland Browns players
People from Manassas, Virginia
Players of American football from Virginia
Sportspeople from the Washington metropolitan area
Virginia Tech Hokies football players
American Conference Pro Bowl players